"If You're Going Through Hell (Before the Devil Knows)" is a song written by Dave Berg, Sam Tate and Annie Tate, and recorded by American country music artist Rodney Atkins. It was released in January 2006 as the lead-off single to his second album If You're Going Through Hell.  The song became Atkins' first number one hit on the U.S. Billboard Hot Country Songs chart, spending four weeks at that position. The song also peaked at number 33 on the Billboard Hot 100. "If You're Going Through Hell" was named the number-one song of 2006 on the Billboard's year-end chart.

Content
The title was inspired by two quotes: one from Winston Churchill ("If you're going through Hell, keep going.") and the other, an old Irish toast ("May you be in Heaven five minutes before the devil knows you're dead").

Music video
The music video was directed by Eric Welch. It starts out with Rodney Atkins's car tearing up, and he winds up walking on the road with a string of bad luck throughout the video, like losing his luggage when he throws it in the back of someone's car which winds up taking off on him. The video features Atkins's band and Atkins singing the song under an old gas station sign.

Chart performance
"If You're Going Through Hell (Before the Devil Knows)" debuted at #53 on the U.S. Billboard Hot Country Songs chart for the week of January 21, 2006.

Year-end charts

Certifications

References

2006 singles
2006 songs
Rodney Atkins songs
Billboard Hot Country Songs number-one singles of the year
Songs written by Dave Berg (songwriter)
Curb Records singles